Bobby Brown (born 24 November 1953) is an English former football player and manager.

Playing career 
Brown played for Chelsea, Sheffield Wednesday, Aldershot F.C. Boston United, Thionville and Caen.

Coaching career 
He managed French sides Bourges, Dunkerque and Boulogne.

References

1953 births
Living people
Footballers from Plymouth, Devon
English footballers
Association football forwards
English football managers
English Football League players
Chelsea F.C. players
Sheffield Wednesday F.C. players
Aldershot F.C. players
Boston United F.C. players
Thionville FC players
Stade Malherbe Caen players
Ligue 2 players
US Boulogne managers
Bourges 18 managers
English expatriate footballers
English expatriate football managers
English expatriate sportspeople in France
Expatriate footballers in France
Expatriate football managers in France
USL Dunkerque managers